Buzzy Rides the Range is a 1940 American western film directed by Richard C. Kahn and starring Robert 'Buzz' Henry, Dave O'Brien and Claire Rochelle. It was produced as a second feature with shooting take place in studios in Phoenix, Arizona. It was rereleased in 1948 by Astor Pictures under the alternative title of Western Terror.

It was followed by a sequel Buzzy and the Phantom Pinto in 1941.

Synopsis
After a spate of cattle rustling in the area Myra, the owner of the Harding ranch, sends for a Marshal's assistance. He decides to go undercover by posing as an injured gold prospector and with the help of her younger brother Buzz, he proves that the leader of the rustlers is in fact her neighboring ranch owners.

Cast
 Robert 'Buzz' Henry as Buzzy Harding 
 Dave O'Brien as Ken Blair
 Claire Rochelle as 	Myra Harding
 George Morrell as Dude Bates
 George Eldredge as Fred Ames 
 Frank Merlo as Henchman Mesa 
 Don Kelly as 	Henchman Deck
 Blue Rex as Rex, Buzzy's Horse
 Phil Arnold as 	Peewee - Ranchhand

References

Bibliography
 Pitts, Michael R. Western Movies: A Guide to 5,105 Feature Films. McFarland, 2012.

External links
 

1940 films
1940 Western (genre) films
American Western (genre) films
Films directed by Richard C. Kahn
American black-and-white films
1940s English-language films
1940s American films